Johann Michael Ferdinand Heinrich Hofmann (19 March 1824 – 23 June 1911) was a German painter of the late 19th to early 20th century. He was the uncle of the German painter Ludwig von Hofmann. He was born in Darmstadt and died in Dresden. He is best known for his many paintings depicting the life of Jesus Christ.

Life
Heinrich Hofmann grew up in a family that harbored a deep interest in art. His father, advocate Heinrich Karl Hofmann (1795–1845) painted in watercolors, his mother Sophie Hofmann, née Volhard (1798–1854) gave lessons in art before she married, and his four brothers all showed artistic talent. Heinrich, however, was the only one for whom art was not only a profession but the center of his life.

Hofmann received his first lessons in art from the copper engraver Ernst Rauch in Darmstadt. Then, in 1842, he entered the Academy of Art in Düsseldorf and attended the classes given in painting by Theodor Hildebrandt. Later, he was accepted into the studio of Wilhelm von Schadow and there he created his first large painting: A scene from the life of Alboin, King of the Langobards.

Thereafter, he traveled to the Netherlands and France to intensify his studies of art. In 1846, Hofmann visited the Academy of Art in Antwerp. After passing a longer period of time in Munich he returned to Darmstadt in 1848, and at that time, he began an intensive phase of painting portraits. The young artist found that the political activities of his family opened many doors to influential persons of the time. This afforded him the opportunity to create two portraits of Heinrich von Gagern and one of Justus von Liebig (this portrait is now in the possession of Queen of the United Kingdom). In 1851, Hofmann went to Dresden to visit the art gallery there. In 1853, he traveled to Prague to paint the portrait of Dr. Beer, Great Grand Master of the Brotherhood of the Knights of the Cross.

In 1853, Hofmann returned to Darmstadt, and in the beginning of 1854, his beloved mother died. He was deeply moved by her death and it inspired him to paint his first large religious work: Burial of Christ.

In fall of 1854, he started on a journey to Italy. His first longer stop was in Venice and he used the time there to study Giorgione, Bellini and Giotto (in nearby Padua). After having proceeded to Florence – where Hofmann stayed for two months – he then went to Rome in January 1855. The comprehensive correspondence with his family and his detailed diary reports convey an impression of his way of painting at that time. He was deeply impressed by artwork of Antiquity, Christianity and the Renaissance.

Not long after his arrival in Rome, he was introduced to Peter von Cornelius (1783–1867) and frequently paid him a visit. When he began his masterpiece The Arrest of Jesus in 1854, this work awakened the interest of Cornelius and for 4 years he accompanied Hofmann with his counsel and his constructive criticism. In 1858 the painting was finished and acquired by the Grand Duchy Art Gallery in Darmstadt. (It is still there – not on exhibition but in the archives of the Hessisches Landesmuseum.)

In 1858, Hofmann returned to Darmstadt and in the following year he married Elisabeth Werner. The couple had no children.

Now another period of painting portraits began. In addition Hofmann created a large altarpiece for the church in Obermörlen (Hesse): “Madonna with Christ Child and apostles Paul and Peter”. Some time later an altarpiece for Væggerløse Church (Denmark) was painted: “The Resurrected Christ”.

In 1862, Hofmann and his wife moved to Dresden. More and more he devoted himself to the genre of religious paintings. In 1870, Heinrich Hofmann was appointed successor of Professor Johann Carl Baehr of the Academy of Art in Dresden whose honorable member he already was. In 1872, King Johann bestowed on him the Great Golden Medal and later he received the Albrecht-Medal from King Albert. In 1891, Hofmann’s wife died and soon after that he withdrew from the Academy of Art in Dresden. Even though he stopped working for the Academy it is obvious from his letters that in private life he continued to create many works of art until his death on 23 June 1911.

Body of works

Four of the most famous works of Hofmann are in the possession of the Riverside Church in New York: Christ and the Rich Young Ruler, Christ in Gethsemane, Christ in the Temple and Christ's Image. According to information of the Riverside Church, the painting Christ in Gethsemane is without much doubt one of the most copied paintings in the world.

The religious body of Hofmann’s work has gained in importance in the past years. One of the reasons for the increasing popularity of his artwork is the publication of his paintings and pencil drawings depicting the life of Jesus Christ in The Second Coming of Christ, the interpretation of the Gospels by Paramahansa Yogananda, the founder of Self Realization Fellowship , responsible for bringing the teachings of Kriya Yoga to the West.

Heinrich Hofmann was one of the pre-eminent painters of his time. The Sunday Strand – at that time a very popular British magazine– describes him as the most influential contemporary German painter. Hofmann’s style of painting was unique in its own way but at the same time he based his work on the traditional art of old German, Dutch and Italian masters. While in Rome he also came in touch with the Nazarenes – especially through the influence of Cornelius – but throughout his life he remained faithful to the great examples of the Renaissance. Religious paintings take the center stage in Hofmann’s work; but he also created numerous portraits and pictures that depict mythological and historical topics.

Selected works
Three of his paintings were purchased by John D. Rockefeller, Jr.: the 1882 studio copy of Christ in the Tempel (1881), Christ and the Young Rich Man (1889), and Christ in Gethsemane (1890).  These now are displayed at the Riverside Church in New York City.

 Scene from the Life of Alboin, King of the Langobards, 1845
 Heinrich von Gagern, 1848, first portrait, in the possession of the Gagern family
 Heinrich von Gagern, 1848, second portrait, Stadtmuseum Stettin
 Justus von Liebig, portrait around 1849, in the possession of the Queen of United Kingdom
 Peter von Cornelius, portrait around 1850, Darmstadt, Institut Mathildenhöhe
 Self-portrait, Institut Mathildenhöhe, Darmstadt
 The Sculptor Ernst Hähnel, Gemäldegalerie Neue Meister, Dresden
 Burial of Christ, 1854, owner unknown
 The Arrest of Christ, 1858, Hessisches Landesmuseum, Darmstadt
 St. Mary with Christ Child and Apostles, 1860, altarpiece for church in Obermörlen (Hesse)
 Resurrected Christ, 1867, altarpiece for church in Vaeggerlose, Denmark
 The Adulteress Before Christ, 1868, Gemäldegalerie Neue Meister, Dresden
 Drawings for the Brockhaus Shakespeare-Galerie, 1870
 Christ Preaching at the Sea of Galilee, 1875, first Nationalgalerie Berlin, then loan to the church administration in Kassel (Hesse), destroyed in the Second World War
 Engagement of Prince Albrecht von Wettin with Zedena von Böhmen, 1878, mural painting, Albrechtsburg, Meißen
 Apotheosis of the Heroes of the Greek Drama, 1876, large ceiling painting in the Royal Theater, Dresden
 Jesus in the Tempel (original), 1881, Gemäldegalerie Neue Meister, Dresden
 Jesus in the Tempel (copy made in Hofmann’s studio: partly done under his supervision, partly by himself), 1882, Riverside Church, New York
 Jesus in the Tempel, 1884, Kunsthalle Hamburg
 Remember Me, 1885, portfolio with drawings depicting the life of Jesus
 Come Unto Me, 1887, portfolio with drawings depicting the life of Jesus
 Christ with Mary and Martha, 1888, Self-Realization Fellowship Temple, Hollywood, Los Angeles
 Christ and the Rich Young Ruler, 1889, Riverside Church, New York
 Christ in Gethsemane, 1890, Riverside Church, New York
 Peace Unto You, 1891, portfolio with drawings depicting the life of Jesus
 Christ's Image, 1894, Riverside Church, New York

Bibliographical references
 NDB (Neue Deutsche Biographie) Vol. 9, p. 458
 Thieme/Becker Vol. 17, 1924
 Saur Allgemeines Künstlerlexikon, bibliographical index A-Z 1999-2000, Vol. 5, p. 24
 Friedrich v. Boetticher, Malerwerke des 19. Jahrhunderts, Dresden, 1895
 Müller, Rosemarie, Heinrich Hofmann, Painter of Christ, Self-Realization Magazine, Winter 2004
 Letters, diaries, records from the estate of Heinrich Hofmann, Hessisches Staatsarchiv (Hessian State Archives), Darmstadt
 Hessisches Landesmuseum Darmstadt, Barbara Bott, Gemälde Hessischer Maler des 19. Jahrhunderts im Hessischen Landesmuseum Darmstadt, Bestandskatalog (Paintings of Hessian Painters of the nineteenth century in the Hessian County Museum, Darmstadt, Catalog)

See also
Warner Sallman

External links

Art at Riverside Church, New York
Zeichnungen von Heinrich Ferdinand Hofmann

19th-century German painters
19th-century German male artists
German male painters
20th-century German painters
20th-century German male artists
1824 births
1911 deaths
Artists from Darmstadt